The 2020 Campanian regional election took place in Campania, Italy, on 20 and 21 September 2020. It was originally scheduled to take place on 31 May 2020, but it was delayed due to the coronavirus pandemic in Italy.

Electoral system
The Regional Council of Campania is composed of 50 members, elected in a party-list proportional representation system. The seats are divided among five constituencies corresponding to the region's provinces: Avellino with 4 seats, Benevento with 2 seats, Caserta with 8 seats, Naples with 27 seats, and Salerno with 9 seats. Regional councillors are selected from party lists at the constituency level, with an electoral threshold at 3%. An additional seat is reserved to the President-elect, who is the candidate winning a plurality of votes. A majority bonus of 60% is granted to the winning coalition.

Background
In February 2020, the direction of the Democratic Party (PD) officially confirmed that the centre-left candidate for President of Campania would be the incumbent President Vincenzo De Luca.

The centre-right coalition picked former President Stefano Caldoro, a member of Forza Italia (FI), as its candidate, after hypotheses of a League's candidate or Mara Carfagna (FI) were abandoned.

The Five Star Movement (M5S) discarded the idea of a coalition with the centre-left, and proposed its own candidate Valeria Ciarambino. Previously, the M5S had proposed the incumbent Minister of Environment Sergio Costa as its candidate.

Parties and candidates

Opinion polls

Candidates

Hypothetical candidates

Parties

Results 
The election saw the victory of the centre-left candidate and incumbent President of Campania, Vincenzo De Luca, who won almost 69.5% of the vote with more than 45% lead over the centre-right candidate Stefano Caldoro. The Five Star Movement candidate, Valeria Ciarambino, arrived third with less than 10% of the vote.

The Democratic Party was the first party by number of votes, with 16.9% of preferences, followed by the list of De Luca and by the Five Star Movement.

Turnout

Elected councillors

See also 
 2020 Italian regional elections

References 

Elections in Campania
2020 elections in Italy
Campanian regional election 2020